Cale Conley (born May 13, 1992) is an American professional stock car racing driver.

Racing career

Conley began in go-karts at age 5, working his way through quarter midgets, open-wheel racing and sprint cars, including World of Outlaws and USAC competition. Conley debuted in the NASCAR K&N Pro Series East in 2011, with his first win coming in 2012 at Columbus Motor Speedway after leading all 150 laps. He competed full-time in the East series in 2013, scoring four top-five finishes.

In February 2014, Conley joined the No. 33 of Richard Childress Racing in the Nationwide Series on a part-time basis, working with crew chief Nick Harrison. Conley was signed to run ten total races. He made his debut at Bristol Motor Speedway in March. Conley started 12th and finished a strong 11th in his debut, after battling from being a lap down. Conley finished 15th at Richmond in April. In July, Conley ran a 160-lap tire test in an RCR Sprint Cup Series car at Nashville Superspeedway. Also in July, Conley announced his support for sponsor IAVA's (Iraq and Afghanistan Veterans of America) "Convoy to Combat Suicide" along with music artists Lady Gaga and Linkin Park.

For 2015, Conley signed with TriStar Motorsports to drive their No. 14 Toyota Camry full-time, running for Rookie of the Year. However, after 30 races, Conley announced that he would not complete the remainder of the season due to a lack of funding.

After being without a ride for the entire 2016 season, Conley joined JGL Racing's "Young Guns Program" in 2017 to drive the No. 24 Camry part-time starting at Charlotte. However, that ended up being his only race in the car all year, and he was without a ride again after that and has not raced in NASCAR ever since.

Personal life
On August 2, 2018, Conley married Emma Blaney, the sister of driver Ryan Blaney.

Motorsports career results

NASCAR
(key) (Bold – Pole position awarded by qualifying time. Italics – Pole position earned by points standings or practice time. * – Most laps led. ** – All laps led.)

Xfinity Series

 Season still in progress 
 Ineligible for series points

K&N Pro Series East

K&N Pro Series West

References

External links

 

Living people
1992 births
People from Vienna, West Virginia
Racing drivers from West Virginia
NASCAR drivers
World of Outlaws drivers
CARS Tour drivers
Richard Childress Racing drivers